Fourka is a village and a former community in the Ioannina regional unit, Epirus, Greece. Since the 2011 local government reform it is part of the municipality Konitsa, of which it is a municipal unit. The municipal unit has an area of 32.374 km2. Population 90 (2011).

Demography

The inhabitants of Furka have traditionally been Aromanians (Vlachs).

References

Populated places in Ioannina (regional unit)
Aromanian settlements in Greece